Mashari Al-Enezi (born July 22, 1989) is a Saudi football player who plays as a forward for Al-Diriyah.

Career
He started his career at Al-Qaisumah and helped the team achieve promotion to the Second Division during the 2007–08 season. On 10 August 2010, he joined First Division side Al-Orobah. He helped the side achieve its first-ever promotion to the Pro League, the top tier of Saudi football. He spent 6 years at the club and scored 66 league goals for the club across the 2 divisions. On 22 June 2016, Al-Enezi joined newly promoted Pro League side Al-Batin. After only six months at Al-Batin, Al-Enezi joined Al-Tai on a six-month loan deal. On 17 July 2017, Al-Enezi joined Al-Tai on a permanent basis. He ended his first season at the club finishing as the top scorer of the MS League with 21 goals as Al-Tai narrowly missed out on promotion. On 7 July 2019, he renewed his contract with Al-Tai for a further season. After being released by Al-Tai, Al-Enezi joined Al-Kawkab on 27 December 2019.

References

1989 births
Living people
Saudi Arabian footballers
Al-Qaisumah FC players
Al-Orobah FC players
Al Batin FC players
Al-Tai FC players
Al-Kawkab FC players
Al-Diriyah Club players
Saudi Professional League players
Saudi First Division League players
Saudi Second Division players
Saudi Fourth Division players
Association football forwards